Mohammad Dzulazlan bin Ibrahim (born 19 November 1988 in Sarawak) is a Malaysian footballer currently playing as right-back for Kuching City in the Malaysia Premier League.

External links
Profile at Playmaker stats

References

1988 births
Living people
Malaysian footballers
People from Kuching
People from Sarawak
Sarawak FA players
Kuching City F.C. players
Malaysia Premier League players
Malaysia Super League players
Association football defenders